"One Shining Moment" is a song written by David Barrett that has become closely associated with the NCAA Division I men's basketball tournament. "One Shining Moment" is traditionally played at the end of CBS's and TBS's coverage of the championship game of the tournament. The song is played as the winning team's players cut down the nets to a montage of highlights from the tournament.

History
Barrett, a singer-songwriter from Ann Arbor, Michigan, was inspired to write the song in 1986 while watching Larry Bird play on TV at a bar called the Varsity Inn in East Lansing, Michigan, after having played a gig there. He wrote the song down on a napkin the next day, later stating that "the song came fully formed" and "all the lyrics just wrote themselves."  He passed the song along to high school friend Armen Keteyian, an investigative journalist for CBS Sports and, at that time, Sports Illustrated, who in turn passed it to CBS Sports' creative director Doug Towey.

Towey originally planned to debut the song not after a basketball game, but after a football game, Super Bowl XXI on January 25, 1987. It was to have been the post-game montage from that contest, but CBS ran past the expected airtime and had a prime time show to debut in the next time slot, so the montage was canceled. CBS then asked Barrett for use of the song after the 1987 NCAA Division I Men's Basketball Championship Game on March 30, in which Indiana beat Syracuse. Towey decided to use "One Shining Moment" to close CBS's coverage of the tournament. The positive public response led to it becoming an annual feature.

Since 2016, TBS, in the even-numbered years, and CBS, the odd-numbered years, broadcasts the championship game biennially. At the beginning of this arrangement there were concerns that the song would not be used in these years due to its association with CBS. However, on March 16, 2016, CBS Sports chairman Sean McManus confirmed that "One Shining Moment" would still be used during years that Turner Sports broadcasts the championship game under the consortium's contract, owing to the long-standing tradition.

In 2020, the NCAA announced a contest for basketball fans to perform their own rendition of the song, with the winning rendition to be played on TBS during the pregame show for the championship game on April 6. However, due to the cancelation of that year's tournament as a result of the COVID-19 pandemic in the United States, the contest was canceled. In addition, because the tournament was canceled, the annual playing of the song in its usual postgame context did not happen for the first time since its 1987 debut, although some teams created their own montages featuring the song.

Versions 
The original version recorded by Barrett was used from 1987 to 1993, and briefly revived between 2000 and 2002 with a new instrumental. Versions recorded by Teddy Pendergrass (1994–1999), Luther Vandross (2003–2009, 2011–2019, 2021–present), and Ne-Yo (2016) have also been used; Vandross' version is believed to be the last song he recorded before his stroke and subsequent death.

A version by Jennifer Hudson was used for the 2010 NCAA Division I men's basketball tournament; the format of the Hudson video deviated from prior years by cutting away from the tournament highlight montage on several occasions to show footage of Hudson singing in a recording studio, drawing criticism from some fans and viewers. In response to the criticism, the Vandross version was restored the following year.

On April 1, 2016, Turner Sports announced that Ne-Yo had performed a version of "One Shining Moment" that would be used on the "Team Stream" broadcasts of the championship game on TNT and TruTV, which were tailored to focus on highlights of the two participating teams, as with the game broadcasts on these channels themselves. The Vandross version was still used for the main telecast on TBS. In an effort to give the song "Turner flair" in honor of TBS's first national championship game broadcast, and to make light of the concerns regarding its use by the network, analyst Charles Barkley performed his own tongue-in-cheek cover of "One Shining Moment" in a commercial promoting that year's tournament.

Lyrics
The first verse is about inspiration and hard work. The second verse deals with adversity, accompanied by highlights of injured players and missed shots. The bridge includes lines such as "Feel the beat of your heart", often shown with players thumping their chests, and "Feel the wind in your face", with video of drives towards the basket.

There is a claim that the first line in the song was changed from "The ball is kicked" to "The ball is tipped."  However, Barrett said "My daughter informed me that they claim that the initial line was the ball is kicked.  That's not the case.  It never was.  The original line was, the gun goes off...which I changed to suit the tournament.  Ironically - I wrote the song about basketball (after watching Larry Bird) but for some reason (who knows what I was thinking?!?) I didn't write it into the original first line.  And so having the first line fall into place as it did was poetic and true."

The Chicago White Sox used the version with "the gun goes off" to close their telecast on the final game at Comiskey Park on September 30, 1990.

Notes

References

Further reading

External links

David Barrett official website
"One Shining Moment" annual videos since 1987 via usatoday.com

1987 songs
CBS Sports
Turner Sports
NCAA Division I men's basketball tournament
Sports television theme songs
College basketball mass media in the United States
College basketball on television in the United States
Teddy Pendergrass songs
Luther Vandross songs
Jennifer Hudson songs
Ne-Yo songs